Hauts-de-Chazal is a new sector of the area of Planoise, located in the west of Besançon (Doubs, Franche-Comté, France).

History 
Hauts-de-Chazal is a sector of Planoise, located in the French city of Besançon. The area was built in 2007 and will receive the new hospital pole of the city, a library, and a medicine faculty. The area is located near Planoise and a residential will be built.

Photos

See also 
 Planoise
 Besançon

Planoise
Areas of Besançon